Changing Focus: Kodak and the Battle to Save a Great American Company is a book about the corporate history and future of the Kodak corporation. In particular, it discusses Kodak's efforts to maintain and diversity its photography businesses in the face of challenges from digital photography, and the mixed results of these efforts.

Further reading
 Changing focus: Kodak and the battle to save a great American company by Alecia Swasy  Publisher: New York : Times Business, c1997.     LCC: HD9708

References 

 
 
 
 
  
 

1997 non-fiction books
History books about the United States
Business books
Kodak